Palikirus is a genus of air-breathing land snails, terrestrial pulmonate gastropod mollusks in the family Charopidae.

Species
Species within the genus Palikirus include:
 Palikirus cosmetus
 Palikirus ponapicus

References

 
Charopidae
Taxonomy articles created by Polbot